The cloud forest grass mouse (Akodon torques) is a species of rodent in the family Cricetidae. 
It is found only in Peru.

References

Musser, G. G. and M. D. Carleton. 2005. Superfamily Muroidea. pp. 894–1531 in Mammal Species of the World a Taxonomic and Geographic Reference. D. E. Wilson and D. M. Reeder eds. Johns Hopkins University Press, Baltimore.

Akodon
Mammals of Peru
Mammals described in 1917
Taxa named by Oldfield Thomas
Taxonomy articles created by Polbot